North Macedonia's telephone numbering plan is the system used for assigning telephone numbers in North Macedonia. It is regulated by the Agency for Electronic Communications (AEK), which holds responsibility for telecommunications.

The country calling code of North Macedonia is +389. Area codes should always be dialed, even within the country, because of the many fixed and mobile operators.

An example for calling telephones in Skopje, Republic of North Macedonia is as follows:

02 xxxxxxx (within Skopje)
02 xxxxxxx (within North Macedonia)
+389 2 xxxxxxx (outside North Macedonia)

Numbering formats for North Macedonia:

+389 2 xxxxxxx  geographic numbers – Skopje 
+389 3x xxxxxx  geographic numbers – eastern area 
+389 4x xxxxxx  geographic numbers – central and western area 
+389 5xx xxxxx  premium, value added, shared revenue 
+389 7x xxxxxx  mobile 
+389 8xx xxxxx  freephone, shared cost

1xx is the general short code format (such as 112 for emergency); 10xx format is for carrier access.

The international call prefix depends on the country you are calling from, e.g. 00 for most European countries, and 011 from America. For domestic calls (within the country), 0 must be dialed before the area code.

For calls from North Macedonia, the prefix for international calls is 00 (e.g. for calling a United States number, 00 1 ... should be dialed).

Landline area codes

Mobile phone number codes

Special service numbers

Numbering plan under the former Yugoslavia 
During Yugoslavia's existence, Macedonian area codes all began with 9. On 1 October 1993, North Macedonia was split from the +38 code and the 9 from the area codes was integrated into the country code. Between 2000 and 2001, the 9 in the area codes was generally changed to either 3 or 4. The area codes for Skopje were changed from (091) to (02). In 2003, all Skopje phone numbers were changed from 6 to 7 digits by having an extra digit added to the front of the original number, meaning that (for example) the Yugoslavian number +38 91 123456 became +389 91 123456 in 1993, then +389 2 3123456. When the extra 3 was added to the beginning of Skopje numbers, new 30x and 39x exchanges became available.

See also
 Telecommunications in North Macedonia
 Makedonski Telekom

Notes

References
ITU allocations list

External links
Agency for Electronic Communications (AEK) 

Macedonia
Telecommunications in North Macedonia